These are the full results of the Athletics at the 2015 European Games which took place in Baku, Azerbaijan, from 21 to 22 June at the Baku National Stadium

Men

100 metres
Wind:Heat 1: -0.9 m/sHeat 2: 0.0 m/s

200 metres
Wind:Heat 1: -0.5 m/sHeat 2: 0.2 m/s

400 metres

800 metres

1500 metres

3000 metres

5000 metres

3000 metres steeplechase

110 metres hurdles
Wind:Heat 1: +0.1 m/sHeat 2: +0.2 m/s

400 metres hurdles

4 × 100 metres relay

4 × 400 metres relay

High jump

Pole vault

Long jump

Triple jump

Shot put

Discus throw

Hammer throw

Javelin throw

Women

100 metres
Wind:Heat 1: -0.4 m/sHeat 2: 0.3 m/s

200 metres
Wind:Heat 1: -0.9 m/sHeat 2: +0.5 m/s

400 metres

800 metres

1500 metres

3000 metres

5000 metres

3000 metres  steeplechase

100 metres hurdles
Wind:Heat 1: -0.5 m/sHeat 2: 0.0 m/s

400 metres hurdles

4 × 100 metres relay

4 × 400 metres relay

High jump

Pole Vault

Long jump

Triple jump

Shot put

Discus Throw

Hammer Throw

Javelin Throw

External links
european-athletics.org

2015